Brian Jones (born c. 1950) is a retired Canadian football player who played for the Edmonton Eskimos. He played college football at the University of Alberta.

References

1950s births
Living people
Edmonton Elks players
Place of birth missing (living people)
Year of birth uncertain
University of Alberta alumni